Chen Jeng-i (born January 23, 1974) is a Taiwanese football player who currently plays for Tatung F.C. as a defender. He can play both right back and left back and was voted as one of the best defenders in 2005 league season.

Playing history 
 Feng Lin Primary School (鳳林國小)
 Feng Lin Junior High School (鳳林國中)
 Chung Cheng Industrial Vocational High School
 Taipei Physical Education College
 Lukuang football team
 Tatung F.C.

References 

1974 births
Living people
Taiwanese footballers
Chinese Taipei international footballers
Tatung F.C. players
Footballers from Kaohsiung
Association football defenders